The Gower Wassail is a wassail song from Gower in Wales, UK. Wassailing is a midwinter tradition wherein either orchards or households are blessed by guisers, which came to Wales through exposure to English custom. The song is printed in A.L. Lloyd's book Folk Song in England (1967), having been heard from Phil Tanner. Structurally,  the song is in 6/8 time with bacchius trisyllables, a Balliol rhyme scheme, and the "ffal de radl" musical syllables characteristic of much of Welsh folk songs. Some of the lyrics closely resemble other popular wassailing songs, such as the 'Gloucestershire Wassail'

Lyrics
The majority of versions of the song begin with the same two stanzas, although pronouns (i.e. you, we, your, our, etc.) vary. Following the second verse and chorus, the number of stanzas and their order vary from version to version. The primary difference between the lyrics that appear here is that one version is a dialogue between the wassailers and the master and mistress they are appealing to for hospitality. The other version is sung from the wassailers’ perspective alone. All the known stanzas are included below.

Opening Stanzas
A-wassail, a-wassail throughout all the town
Our cup it is white and our ale it is brown
Our wassail is made of the good ale and cake (too)
Some nutmeg and ginger, the best you can bake (do)

Our wassail is made of the elderberry bough
And so my good neighbors we'll drink unto thou
Besides all on earth, you have apples in store
Pray let us come in for it's cold by the door

Main references
Mudcat Café:

Versions 

Shirley Collins on Anthems in Eden
Steeleye Span on the album Ten Man Mop, or Mr. Reservoir Butler Rides Again and on The Journey

External links
Gower wassail sung by Phil Tanner
Gower wassail sung by Melissa Weaver Dunning
Gower wassail sung by Steeleye Span
Gower wassail sung by the Stairwell Carollers 
Gower wassail sung by the Quadriga Consort

References

Gower Peninsula
Welsh folk songs
British Christmas songs
Year of song missing
Year of song unknown
Songwriter unknown